David Newman (February 4, 1937 – June 27, 2003) was an American screenwriter.  From the late 1960s through the early 1980s he frequently collaborated with Robert Benton. He was married to fellow writer Leslie Newman, with whom he had two children, until his death in 2003 from a stroke.

Career
Newman studied at the University of Michigan. He went to work at Esquire magazine where he met Robert Benton. The two of them wrote Bonnie and Clyde which made them highly in demand in Hollywood. From the University of Michigan GARGAlum Newsletter, 2002: "David Newman, 1958 University of Michigan humor magazine Gargoyle editor, has been nominated for the Academy Award, won the New York Film Critics Award, the National Society of Film Critics Award, and three Writers Guild of America Awards for various screen plays including: Bonnie & Clyde, Superman I, II and II among many others, David received his BA and MA at U of M where he twice won the Avery Hopwood Award. David became an editor at Esquire Magazine, He co-created the Dubious Achievement Awards. He took pride in having coined the phrase: 'Why is this man laughing?' and wished he had copyrighted it."

When Benton became a director, Newman started collaborating with his wife Leslie.

Works

Films

Theatrical stage

References

External links

American male screenwriters
1937 births
2003 deaths
American film producers
University of Michigan alumni
Writers Guild of America Award winners
20th-century American male writers
20th-century American screenwriters
Hugo Award-winning writers